Erie J. Sauder (August 6, 1904 – June 29, 1997) was an American inventor and furniture-maker. He invented a knock-down table in 1951 that could be assembled by the average person with minimal skills. The line expanded into cocktail tables, lamp tables, end tables, step tables and corner tables. This started the ready-to-assemble furniture industry.

Biography 
Sauder was born in Archbold, Ohio, to Daniel and Anne (Schrock) Sauder. In 1927, he married Leona Short. He had only an eighth grade education and was a Mennonite cabinet maker. Sauder worked at the Archbold Ladder Company in his home town before he started his own business in 1934.

At first Sauder made kitchen cabinets in the town where he was born. He also manufactured other wood products based on requests. Early on in his new business a large order came in from a local chicken hatchery farm that needed certain specialized sticks to insert between incubator cages. He took on the project, with his wife sawing the boards while he finished the product off. The order was enough to feed their family at five dollars per week.

A few years after he had started his woodworking business, an established local church burned down. Sauder was awarded a contract to build new pews for the church. This introduced his business into church furniture and eventually his company became a leading manufacturer of church furniture throughout the nation.

He continued to make specialized wood cabinets, church furniture and pews, and wooden occasional tables throughout the 1940s and 1950s. In 1954, because of his further interest in the ready-to-assemble furniture business, Sauder divided up his company and formed the Sauder Manufacturing Company. This new company took on the manufacturing of church pews, while the "snap-together" furniture continued at Sauder Woodworking Company. The Sauder furniture business remains in the same place. It is the fifth largest residential furniture manufacturer in America and the world's leading manufacturer of ready-to-assemble (RTA) furniture. Sauder remained as president of the Sauder Woodworking Company until 1975 when two of his sons, Maynard and Myrl, took over the businesses. During his retirement years, he created Sauder Village, a nineteenth century historical outdoor museum showing life of that time period in Ohio.

The Barn Restaurant is also under the Sauder family ownership, founded in 1976. The building itself was created in 1861 and modeled in the 1970s to be a family style restaurant by the Sauder family. The common meal at the Barn Restaurant is their buffet which consists of mashed potatoes and broasted chicken which is served daily, along with roast beef, ham, pork chops, and the soup and salad bar, they also serve ice cream. There are many other fix-ins that vary throughout the week.

References

External links 

1904 births
1997 deaths
People from Fulton County, Ohio
American Mennonites
20th-century American inventors